Germania Fußball-Verein was a football club based in Mexico City that played in the México Primera División from 1915 to 1933.

History

Beginnings

The club was founded in 1915 in a German immigrant community in  Mexico City. The founders were Edvard Giffenig, Germán Stuht, Richard Obert, Walter Mues, and Carl Mues. In their first years the club mostly finished last or close to the bottom of the standings.

In 1920, the Mexican federation split the tournament into two leagues: the national and the Mexican leagues. Germania played in the Mexican league along with Asturias F.C., México FC, Morelos and Deportivo Internacional, América, España, L´Amicale Francaise, Reforma, and Luz y Fuerza. In the same year, Germania won its only league title, though it was not officially recognised because of the political situation at the time.

1922–1923
Germania reinforced the club by signing Kurt Friederich, who had played in FC Zürich. On 6 May 1923, in a title match between Germania and Asturias F.C., Friedrich led Germania to a one-point lead in the first half. In the second half, however, with the clubs tied at 1–1, Octavio Rimada managed to score for Asturias, giving the club a 2–1 lead which they held to the end of the match to once again proclaim themselves champions. In that tournament Kurt Friederich won the title for scoring, with 12 goals in 13 games.

Coaches
 Richard Obert coached the club from 1915 to 1930
   Juan Luqué de Serrallonga coached from 1930 to 1933

Honours
 National league (1): 1920–21
 Copa México (1): 1919
 Runner up Liga Amateur del Distrito Federal in 1922–23
 Runner up Copa México in 1933

Footnotes

Defunct football clubs in Mexico City
Association football clubs established in 1915
1915 establishments in Mexico
1933 disestablishments in Mexico
German association football clubs outside Germany
Association football clubs disestablished in 1933
German diaspora in North America
Primera Fuerza teams